Coerce is a post-hardcore band originally from Adelaide, South Australia and now reside in Melbourne, Victoria. In 2009 Coerce released their debut album Silver Tongued Life Licker and were a Triple J Next Crop artist. 

Their second album, Ethereal Surrogate Saviour,  was nominated for Best Hard Rock/Heavy Metal Album at the ARIA Music Awards of 2011.
The band toured Australia extensively during the most active years of 2009-2012 supporting Russian Circles, Graf Orlock, Dangers, Robotosaurus and played the Big Day Out in Adelaide in 2010.

Band members
Mike Deslandes
Matthew Adey
Karl Roberts
Justin Bond

Discography

Studio albums

Extended plays

Awards

ARIA Music Awards
The ARIA Music Awards is an annual awards ceremony that recognises excellence, innovation, and achievement across all genres of Australian music. Coerce have been nominated for one award.

|-
| 2011
| Ethereal Surrogate Saviour
| ARIA Award for Best Hard Rock or Heavy Metal Album
| 
|-

Fowler's Live Music Awards
The Fowler's Live Music Awards took place from 2012 to 2014 to "recognise success and achievement over the past 12 months [and] celebrate the great diversity of original live music" in South Australia. Since 2015 they're known as the South Australian Music Awards.

 
|-
| 2012
| Coerce
| Best Punk Artist 
| 
|-

References

External links
 Band Website

Musical groups from Melbourne
Musical groups from Adelaide
Australian post-hardcore musical groups
Musical quartets